The following is a list of the television networks and announcers who broadcast the World Bowl.  The World Bowl was the championship game of the now defunct NFL Europa (and its forerunner, the World League of American Football).

See also
NFL_Europe#Television_coverage

ABC Sports
Monday Night Football
USA Network Sports
Fox Sports announcers
NFL Network
+
Lists of National Football League announcers
Broadcasters